Jaroslav Dietl (22 May 1929 – 29 June 1985) was a Czech television series writer, film and television screenwriter, and playwright working mainly during the Normalization period. He is known for such works as the coming-of-age drama Inženýrská odysea.

Life
Dietl was born in Zagreb, Croatia, in 1929. In less than four years, however, he moved with his Czech parents and two sisters first to Borovany, and later to Brno. There, he attended primary school and in 1940–1944, he was a student at a grammar school in Brno. From there, he went to a textile industrial school, from which he graduated in 1949. Following this, Dietl studied at the Faculty of Arts at Masaryk University in Brno for a year, then worked as an apprentice teacher, also in Brno. He decided to leave Brno for Prague after getting a job at the Ministry of Social Welfare. In Prague from 1950 to 1955, he was a student at the Academy of Performing Arts, where he took screenwriting and dramaturgy. While still studying, he became the dramaturge of the newly emerging Czechoslovak Television. In 1962, Dietl changed jobs, moving to the Czechoslovak State Film Agency, eventually becoming a professional writer. In 1973, he was expelled from the Communist Party of Czechoslovakia. A year before his death in 1985, however, he was awarded the title of "Accomplished Artist".

Work
Dietl is known mainly for his work on the television series Hospital at the End of the City, The Youngest of the Hamr Family, Muž na radnici, Plechová kavalérie, Žena za pultem, Okres na severu, Synové a dcery Jakuba skláře, and Frankenstein's Aunt, as well as the films Tři chlapi v chalupě and Nejlepší ženská mého života. Dietl wrote a number of plays, television series, and film scripts, and also published in the  daily Mladá fronta and the magazine Dikobraz.

Dietl is considered to have been the first Czech writer to create multi-generational drama series, usually on a grand scale. The scheme of his narration was based on certain social environments, such as health, agriculture, industry, and trade, which framed the behaviour and relationships of his characters.

Selected filmography

External links
 Paulina Bren focuses on Dietl's work in her book The Greengrocer and His TV: The Culture of Communism after the 1968 Prague Spring (Cornell University Press, 2012), and discusses Dietl in this interview.
 

1929 births
1985 deaths